The Girl from the Red Cabaret (Spanish: La chica del Molino Rojo) is a 1973 Spanish musical drama film directed by Eugenio Martín and starring Marisol, Renaud Verley and Mel Ferrer.

The film's sets were designed by the art director Gil Parrondo.

Cast
 Marisol as María Marcos 
 Renaud Verley as Larry Elliot 
 Mel Ferrer as Dalton Harvey 
 Silvia Tortosa as Gina 
 Mirta Miller as Rosita 
 Manuel de Blas as Malcolm Higgins 
 Bárbara Rey as Grace 
 Nene Morales
 Norma Kastel as Martine 
 Eduardo Calvo as Gerente del Molino Rojo 
 Sofía Casares as Corista 
 Ketty de la Cámara
 Víctor Israel as Abogado 
 Vicente Roca
 Lucy Tiller
 Ángel Martín

References

Bibliography 
 Mira, Alberto. Historical Dictionary of Spanish Cinema. Scarecrow Press, 2010.

External links 
 

1973 films
Spanish musical drama films
1970s musical drama films
1970s Spanish-language films
Films directed by Eugenio Martín
1973 drama films
1970s Spanish films